Jammer may refer to:

Signal blocking devices
 Radar jammer, a device used in radar jamming and deception
 Radio jammer, a device used in radio jamming
 Radio-controlled Improvised Explosive Device jammer, a counter-IED device 
 Mobile phone jammer, an instrument used to prevent cellular phones from receiving signals from base stations

Sports
 Jammer (American football), a special teams position
 Jammer (mascot), mascot of the Northern League Joliet Jackhammers
 Jammer (swimwear), a type of male competitive swimwear
 Jammer, the scoring position in roller derby
 Jamestown Jammers, a minor league baseball team

People
 Daniel Jammer (born 1966), Jewish German-Israeli businessman and entrepreneur
 Max Jammer (1915–2010), Israeli physicist and Rector and Acting President of Bar-Ilan University 
 Quentin Jammer (born 1979), American retired National Football League player
 Jammer (rapper) (born 1982), English rapper and producer

Entertainment
 The Jammers, American electronic music studio group
 Players of National Geographic Animal Jam
 Jammers, a group of characters in the TV series The Prisoner who use misdirection to confuse onlookers with misinformation

See also
 Red Jammers, buses used to shuttle guests around Glacier National Park
 Jamming (disambiguation)